

A14A Anabolic steroids

A14AA Androstan derivatives
A14AA01 Androstanolone
A14AA02 Stanozolol
A14AA03 Metandienone
A14AA04 Metenolone
A14AA05 Oxymetholone
A14AA06 Quinbolone
A14AA07 Prasterone
A14AA08 Oxandrolone
A14AA09 Norethandrolone

A14AB Estren derivatives
A14AB01 Nandrolone
A14AB02 Ethylestrenol
A14AB03 Oxabolone cipionate

A14B Other anabolic agents

References

A14